Lumbarda Psephisma (also referred to as Lumbardian Decree-Psefizam) is a stone inscription telling about the founding of an Ancient Greek settlement on the island of Korčula, in modern-day Croatia. The Psephisma is from Lumbarda, a small village where it was discovered in 1877 by Božo Kršinić. The Lumbarda Psephisma is kept in the Archaeological Museum in Zagreb.

The stone inscription
The stone inscription has a written decree that details the agreement surrounding the establishment of a Greek colony in the 4th or 3rd century BC. The text provides information on the Greeks from the island of Issa, today known as Vis. The Greeks established a settlement on the basis of a prior agreement with the representatives of the local Illyrians who were Pyllos and his son Dazos.

"During the time of the Hieromnemon Praxidamos, in the Machanemus month, the contract about the founding of the settlement was drawn up between the people from Issa and Pyllos and his son Dazos. The founders agreed and the people decided: that those who first took the land and walled the town would get special sites for building inside the fortified town ...and that the authorities swear that the town and the land will never again be divided .. ." 

The Lumbarda Psephisma was discovered on the top of the hill called Koludrt. It is understood that is where the Issian town most likely once stood.
The stone inscription ends with 200 names of Greek families. This valuable document is the oldest found on the territory of Croatia. It places the Illyrians on the island of Korčula and is an insight into the Greeks setting up colonies throughout Dalmatia. The colonies were set up so the Greeks could trade with the Illyrians. There is no evidence to suggest that the two communities interacted on a larger scale but rather kept to themselves. The Illyrians who had lived their ancient ways in the region for centuries would have been a sharp contrast to the Greeks Hellinic way of doing things with their urban culture and social organization. Nevertheless the two communities lived peacefully until the Illyrian Wars with the Romans.

Greek colonies
Based on historical facts there were two Greek Colonies on Korčula. Periegesis in the 1st century mentions a Greek Cnidian colony on island Black Kerkyra (Korčula)  Greek colonists from Corcyra (Corfu) formed a small colony on the island in the 6th century BC. Black Corfu (Korčula) was named after their homeland and, the black was added to reflect the dense cypress and pine-woods on Korčula itself. Archeological finds are numerous, including carved marble tombstones, ceramics and foundations of Greek villas. These artifacts can be found in the town of Korčula's island museum.

See also
Croatia
Lumbarda
Korčula

References

External links
 www.korcula.net

Greek inscriptions
Illyrian Croatia
Hellenistic Croatia
1877 in Croatia